The 2008–09 CONCACAF Champions League was the first edition of the CONCACAF club football championship modelled after the UEFA Champions League, replacing the CONCACAF Champions' Cup, and overall the 44th edition of the premier football club competition organized by CONCACAF, the regional governing body of North America, Central America and the Caribbean. The championship began on August 26, 2008, and it concluded May 12, 2009. Atlante of Mexico won the championship after defeating Cruz Azul, also from Mexico on aggregate at the Final. They represented CONCACAF in the 2009 FIFA Club World Cup.

Qualification

24 teams from 13 nations participated in the 2008–09 CONCACAF Champions League from the North American, Central American, and Caribbean zones.  Nine of the teams came from North America, twelve from Central America, and three from the Caribbean. Below is the qualification scheme for the 2008-09 competition:

Teams in bold qualify directly for the Group Stage.

1 New England were both the 2007 U.S. Open Cup winners and the 2007 MLS Cup runners-up, so Chivas USA  claimed USA4 as the 2007 MLS Supporters' Shield runners-up.

2 Saprissa were both the 2007 Invierno and 2008 Verano winners, so Alajuelense has claimed CRC2 as the 2008 Verano runners-up.

3 Luis Ángel Firpo were both the 2007 Apertura and 2008 Clausura winners, so Isidro Metapán has claimed SLV2 as the 2008 Clausura runners-up.

4 San Francisco were both the 2007 Clausura and 2008 Apertura winners, so Tauro has claimed PAN2 as the 2008 Apertura runners-up.

Format
There was a two-legged Preliminary Round for 16 clubs, with the eight winners advancing to the Group Stage.  They were joined by the other eight teams who were seeded directly into the Group Stage.  The clubs involved in the Group Stage were placed into four groups of four with each team playing the others in its group in both home and away matches.  The top two teams from each group will advance to the Knockout Rounds, which will consist of two-legged ties.  The Final Round, to be held in late April 2009, were also two-legged.  Also, unlike the previously contested CONCACAF Champions' Cup, the away goals rule is used in the CONCACAF Champions League, but does not apply after a tie goes into extra time.

Schedule

Preliminary round

The draw for the preliminary round was held on 11 June 2008 in New York City.  The first legs of the preliminary round were played  26–28 August 2008, while the second legs were played 2–4 September 2008.

|}

The effects of Hurricane Gustav led to the cancellation of the first leg of the Harbour View - UNAM tie, and as a result the tie was contested as a single match.

Group stage

The Group Stage draw was held on 11 June 2008 in New York City and was unveiled on 16 June 2008. Winners and runners-up of each group advance to the quarterfinals.

Group A

Cruz Azul were ranked ahead of Saprissa based on head-to-head record, which is the first tiebreaker.

Group B

Group C

Atlante were ranked ahead of Montreal Impact based on head-to-head record, which is the first tiebreaker.

Group D

Puerto Rico Islanders were ranked ahead of Tauro based on head-to-head record, which is the first tiebreaker.

Championship round

The draw for the Championship Round was held on 10 December 2008. In each round, teams will play their opponent once at home and once away. The four group winners from the Group Stage will play the second leg at home in the Quarterfinals. The order of the home and away matches for the Semifinals and Finals were determined at the draw.

In all rounds, if two teams are tied after both legs then two 15-minute halves of extra time are played. If the two teams are still tied on total goals after extra time a penalty shootout determines the winner.

Bracket

Quarterfinals
The first legs of the Quarterfinals were played from 24 February 2009 to 26 February 2009, while the second legs were played from 3 March 2009 to 5 March 2009.

|}

Semifinals
The first legs of the Semifinals were played on 17 March and 18 March 2009, while the second legs were played on 7 April and 8 April 2009.

|}

Final

The two-legged Final was played on 22 April and 12 May 2009.  The second leg was originally scheduled for 29 April, but was postponed until 12 May by CONCACAF due to concerns over an outbreak of Swine Flu in Mexico.

|}

Top goalscorers

References

 
CONCACAF Champions League seasons
1